Brian M. Lewis (born December 5, 1974) is an American athlete, winner of gold medal in 4 × 100 m relay at the 2000 Summer Olympics.

Born in Sacramento, California, Brian Lewis played baseball (his father and uncle had played professional baseball) through his ninth grade, but moved then to athletics, because he did not want his father to coach him. Lewis graduated from Highlands High School in 1993.

Lewis was the member of American 4 × 100 m relay team, that did not finish its heat at the 1997 World Championships. At the 1998 Goodwill Games, Lewis was third in 100 m.

In 1999, Lewis won the US National Championships in 100 m and ran the third leg on the American 4 × 100 m relay team, which won the gold medal at the World Championships and also reached the semifinals of 100 m.

At the Sydney Olympics, Lewis ran the third leg on the gold medal-winning American 4 × 100 m relay team.

External links
 Brian Lewis at USATF
 
 
 
 

1974 births
Living people
Track and field athletes from Sacramento, California
African-American male track and field athletes
American male sprinters
Athletes (track and field) at the 2000 Summer Olympics
Olympic gold medalists for the United States in track and field
World Athletics Championships medalists
Medalists at the 2000 Summer Olympics
Goodwill Games medalists in athletics
World Athletics Championships winners
Norfolk State Spartans athletes
Competitors at the 1998 Goodwill Games
21st-century African-American sportspeople
20th-century African-American sportspeople